Aidan Brooker (born 10 September 1995) is a South African first-class cricketer. He was included in Northern Cape's squad for the 2016 Africa T20 Cup.

References

External links
 

1995 births
Living people
South African cricketers
Northern Cape cricketers
Cricketers from Kimberley, Northern Cape